The 1953 Gent–Wevelgem was the 15th edition of the Gent–Wevelgem cycle race and was held on 29 March 1953. The race started in Ghent and finished in Wevelgem. The race was won by Raymond Impanis.

General classification

References

Gent–Wevelgem
1953 in road cycling
1953 in Belgian sport
March 1953 sports events in Europe